Karate at the 2002 West Asian Games was held at the Ittihad Hall, Kuwait City, Kuwait.

Medalists

Kata

Kumite

Medal table

References

Official website

External links
Olympic Council of Asia - 2002 West Asian Games

West Asian Games
2002 West Asian Games